Sidhika Sharma is an Indian actress who works mainly in Telugu films. She rose to fame after playing the supporting role in Paisa.

Filmography
 All films are in Telugu, Otherwise noted

Music videos

References

External links

  
 

Actresses in Telugu cinema
Living people
Indian film actresses
21st-century Indian actresses
Punjabi music
People from Dehradun
1995 births